The  Tallulah Book Club Building, located at 515 Dabney St. in Tallulah, Louisiana, was built in 1930. It was listed on the National Register of Historic Places in 1991.

It was designed by architect William Stanton in Spanish Revival/Mission Revival style.

It has served as a women's clubhouse and as a lending library for the community and parish. It was originally named the Tallulah Literary Club, and was an organization founded in 1902 by a group of women. The building made them the only Federated Women's Club in Louisiana to own its own building.

See also
Tallulah Men's Club Building
National Register of Historic Places listings in Madison Parish, Louisiana

References

National Register of Historic Places in Louisiana
Mission Revival architecture in Louisiana
Buildings and structures completed in 1930
Madison Parish, Louisiana
Clubhouses in Louisiana
Clubhouses on the National Register of Historic Places in Louisiana
Women's clubs in the United States
Women's club buildings
Libraries in Louisiana
History of women in Louisiana